Dennis Dourandi (born February 8, 1983) is a Cameroonian footballer who currently plays as a striker for Université FC de Ngaoundéré.

External links
 Profile
 2. Bundesliga statistics

Living people
1983 births
Étoile Sportive du Sahel players
Újpest FC players
SpVgg Greuther Fürth players
Cameroonian footballers
S.C. Olhanense players
Unisport Bafang players
Association football forwards
Cameroonian expatriate footballers
Expatriate footballers in Hungary
Cameroonian expatriate sportspeople in Hungary
Expatriate footballers in Portugal
Cameroonian expatriate sportspeople in Portugal
Expatriate footballers in Germany
Cameroonian expatriate sportspeople in Germany
Expatriate footballers in Tunisia
Cameroonian expatriate sportspeople in Tunisia